Werner Gerich (25 August 1919 – 17 April 2003) also known as Ge Lixi, was a German engineer and technical consultant.

Life 
Gerich was born and died at Mannheim. He worked as a quality control inspector at the Karlsruhe Institute of Technology before his retirement. At the age of 65, he joined the Senior Experten Service (SES) based in Bonn. In 1984 he was sent as an expert to the Chinese city of Wuhan, where he first served as a consultant on assembly and quality control at a state-run diesel motor factory, and later as its general director. Gerich was the first foreign factory director in China since the Revolution of 1949. In his two years as director, he renewed the run-down factory through drastic reforms and brought about technical improvements to its diesel engines.

Honors 
For his service as an SES expert, Gerich was made an honorary citizen of the city of Wuhan, and an honorary professor at Wuhan University. He was awarded the German Order of Merit in 1987. The city of Wuhan installed a bronze bust of him in his honor in 2005, making him the third German, after Karl Marx and Friedrich Engels, to be so honored in China.

In 2008, the Office for Foreign Experts in Beijing placed him on their list of 15 foreigners who had made the greatest impact on China's development since 1978.

External links 
 Gerich (Werner Gerich) in the Ostasienlexikon of the East Asia Institute at Ludwigshafen am Rhein

Citations 

China–Germany relations
Engineers from Mannheim
People from Bretten
Recipients of the Cross of the Order of Merit of the Federal Republic of Germany
1919 births
2003 deaths